The Dutch Basketball League Statistical Player of the Year is an award given to the player who has the best statistical season in the Dutch highest professional basketball league. The player with the highest Player efficiency rating receives the award from the FEB. The award is given after the regular season and was first handed out in 2003 to Travis Reed.

Winners

Awards won by nationality

Awards won by club

References

Dutch Basketball League awards